El Galleguito de la cara sucia is a 1966 Argentine film.

Cast
  Juan Ramón as Francisco "Paco" Ruiz Gonzaga
 Nora Cárpena as Laura Videla Osorio
 Elena Lucena as Madre de Laura
 Eddie Pequenino as Tío Pierre
 Mario Savino as Oficial de Justicia
 Joe Rígoli as Joaquín Regueiro
 Fabio Zerpa as José María
 Diego Varzi as Bebe 
 Cholo Aguirre 
 Los Iracundos
 Julia von Grolman as Mónica
 Chunchuna Villafañe as Karina
 Wagner Mautone as Gustavo

External links
 

1966 films
Argentine comedy-drama films
1960s Spanish-language films
Films directed by Enrique Cahen Salaberry
1960s Argentine films